Sarah Law (born 19 December 1994) is a Scottish rugby player from Penicuik, near Edinburgh. She plays for Scotland and has represented them over fifty times internationally, including at the 2021 Women's Six Nations Championship. Law was the fourth Scottish woman to receive a professional rugby contract from Scotland. She kicked the match-winning penalty in the win against Wales in the 2017 Women's Six Nations Championship to beat the opposing team for the first time in seven years. The win was described a "historic rugby victory" by the Edinburgh Evening News. She repeated the feat under even more pressurised circumstances in 2021 when her 82nd minute conversion of a Chloe Rollie try put Scotland through to the qualification final for the Rugby World Cup at the expense of their opponents Ireland.

Club career 
Law started playing rugby at Penicuik Rugby Club aged five, playing in the mixed mini side throughout her primary school years until she moved to secondary school, aged 11. At that point, she moved on to the Murrayfield Wanderers girls U15/U18 team. She was a scrum half for both the University team and Murrayfield Wanderers. She began playing for Wanderers' senior team in January 2012, as she had just turned 17, and helped them win the league and cup double that season. 

Law played in numerous schools' cup finals and, in 2012, scored 32 points and picked up Player of the Match as Wanderers beat Plockton HS to the Brewin Dolphin Scottish Schools Shield.

She captained the winning 2017 University of Edinburgh team that played in The British Universities and Colleges Sport (BUCS) Championship, defeating Northumbria at Twickenham 48-5.

In 2019, Sarah signed for Darlington Mowden Park Sharks, playing alongside Scottish team mate Lisa Thomson.

International career 
Law first played for Scotland 7s in June 2012. Her international 15-a-side debut took place in the England v Scotland match of 2013 in Esher against England in the Women's Six Nations opener and she scored her first points, a conversion, against Sweden in the eleven-try FIRA victory in Madrid in April 2013. She has played scrum half for most of her career. Since September 2019, she plays stand-off.

In 2017, she played in the match that saw Scotland's Women's team triumph for the first time in seven years in a game against Wales, which saw them secure a 15-14 victory, coming back from being 14-0 down. Her role was described by the Women's Six Nations as "pivotal" to the revival of Scotland's Women's team, as she kicked the match-winning penalty in the game's closing minutes.

Law attributes some of her progress in Scottish Women's rugby to the influence of coach Shade Munro, who began coaching the team in 2016. In 2017, Law was the fourth Scottish woman to receive a professional rugby contract from Scotland. She also earned professional contracts in 2018 and 2020. However, she was out of action for 11 months following the 2018 Six Women's Nations Championship, during which she tore her Achilles tendon.

In 2021 due to injury, Law did not receive one of the eight Scotland Rugby contracts, but received funding support from BT Sport Scottish Rugby Academy. She earned her 40th cap during a 2019 tour to South Africa.

The Championship marked her ninth successive year as part of Scotland’s Six Nations squad, although the team's match against Italy was her first game of any kind for 432 days due to COVID restrictions and a torn Achilles injury. Scotland coach Bryan Easson brought her in at stand-off for the Women’s Six Nations match against Italy, comparing her strategic approach to a chess player: "She moves the pawns around the pitch well and what I mean is that she is a 10 in the women’s game who can think two or three phases ahead rather than phase by phase."

In her international rugby career, she has made 32 starts and 20 appearances as a replacement, scoring 2 tries, 16 conversions and 6 penalty goals.

Personal life 
Sarah Megan Law attended Penicuik High School, where she was head girl. She studied Applied Mathematics at Edinburgh University, before undertaking a part-time Masters in Operational Research with Data Science.

Her father played scrum half at their local club in Penicuik, which is where she picked up the game. Her younger sister Rachel also played for Scotland U20 and has been involved in the extended Scotland squad for a number of years.

Outside of her rugby career, Law worked as a Data Analyst at the University of Edinburgh and is a qualified Operational Research Analyst.

Honours 

 2016-17, Alex Currie Award (most inspirational performance of the year), Edinburgh University Sports Union
 2015-16, Executive Committee Award (major services to club/university sport), Edinburgh University Sports Union
 2013-14, Top Sports Woman Award, Edinburgh University Sports Union

References

External links 
 Sarah Law Scottish Rugby profile page

1994 births
Living people
Alumni of the University of Edinburgh
Scotland women's international rugby union players
Scottish female rugby union players
Sportspeople from Midlothian
Rugby union players from Edinburgh
Rugby union players from Penicuik
Rugby union players from Midlothian
People from Penicuik